Artsakh football league is the top football competition in self-proclaimed Republic of Artsakh. Although there was a football competition held in Artsakh starting 2004, this current league was formed in 2018, being composed of eight clubs. This was expanded in ahead of the 2019 season with 4 additional teams announced, bringing the league to 12 clubs. As of 2021, 9 teams are competing.  Since the Football Federation of Artsakh is not a member of FIFA or UEFA, its clubs cannot take part in any international competitions or tournaments.

Description 
The competition involves clubs from several regions of the Republic of Artsakh and games are held in two rounds.

Current Season Participants

Seasons

References

Top level football leagues in Europe
Sport in the Republic of Artsakh